Grand Chamber may refer to:

Grand Chamber of the European Court of Human Rights, the last instance court of the European Court of Human Rights
A court of the European Court of Justice
The Supreme Court of Georgia (country)
A historic court in the Parlement of Brittany